Sandro Altunashvili (born 19 May 1997) is a Georgian football player. He plays for FC Dinamo Batumi.

International career
He made his debut for the Georgia national football team on 5 September 2021 in a World Cup qualifier against Spain, a 0–4 away loss. He substituted Giorgi Aburjania in the 69th minute.

References

External links
 
 

1997 births
Footballers from Tbilisi
Living people
Footballers from Georgia (country)
Georgia (country) youth international footballers
Georgia (country) under-21 international footballers
Georgia (country) international footballers
Association football midfielders
FC Saburtalo Tbilisi players
FC Dinamo Batumi players
Erovnuli Liga players